was a Japanese dermatologist, the first professor of dermatology at Kyorin University, who proposed the designation of prurigo pigmentosa.

He was born in Tokyo in February 1929. After qualification of a dentist, he graduated from Keio University and entered the Department of Dermatology and Urology in 1955. In 1961, he became assistant professor of Keio University. In 1974, he became the first professor of dermatology at Kyorin University. In 1994, he retired and died in 2010.

In 1971, Nagashima reported a peculiar pruritic dermatosis he designated prurigo pigmentosa. In 1978, he made a report of 14 cases in English. It has come to be recognized as a clinical entity. Although it is mostly reported from Japan, it is reported also from other countries. It is characterized by itchy red papules over the trunk and neck, which fade and leave reticular pigmentation. This disorder has been more common in adult females. About one third improve with dapsone. The cause is not known.

Notes

References
The first report:Nihon Hifuka Gakkai Zasshi 1971:81:78-91.(In Japanese)
The first English report:Nagashima M: Prurigo pigmentosa- Clinical observations in 14 cases. J Dermatol 1978:5:61-7.
Prurigo pigmentosa (Nagashima): in Skin Diseases described in Japan 2004 Teraki Y, Nishikawa T. Journal of German Dermatologic Association(JDDG) 1:2005:(Band 3) 9-25.
Obituary of Masaharu Nagashima, Nihon Hifuka Gakkai Zasshi 2010:120;2167-2170.

Japanese dermatologists
1929 births
2010 deaths